Chandhar is a small town in the Gujranwala District of Punjab, Pakistan.

See also

 Chandhar Airbase

References 

Cities and towns in Gujranwala District
Populated places in Wazirabad Tehsil